The 2370 class were a class of diesel locomotive built in 1975 by English Electric, Rocklea for Queensland Railways in Australia. All were later sold to AN Tasrail.

History

The 2370 class was an evolution of the 2350 class. They were built for use on the Blackwater and Moura coal lines and based at Gladstone. The class became surplus following electrification of the coal lines and in 1987 were all sold to AN Tasrail where they all entered service as the ZB class. They were very similar to the Tasrail Za class.

In 2003, one was sold to South Spur Rail Services and shipped to Western Australia to operate infrastructure trains, it is now owned by Greentrains.

References

External links 

Co-Co locomotives
Diesel locomotives of Queensland
Diesel locomotives of Tasmania
Diesel locomotives of Western Australia
English Electric locomotives
Queensland Rail locomotives
Railway locomotives introduced in 1975
Diesel-electric locomotives of Australia
3 ft 6 in gauge locomotives of Australia